Dunblane Museum is an historic building in the Scottish town of Dunblane, Stirling. Located in The Cross, immediately to the south of Dunblane Cathedral, it is a Category A listed building dating to the early 17th century.

A former townhouse, the building was enlarged in 1765. In 1943, the museum was established to exhibit items from the Dunblane Cathedral, which dates back to the 11th century. The museum's collections have been expanded over the years to include items related to Dunblane's history.

The original sections fronting onto The Cross are thought to have been constructed by James Pearson, who was dean of the cathedral in 1624, for the initials and the coat-of-arms on the carved plaque are his. The first floor of the main block was likely his townhouse. The Kirk Street section is believed to have originally been constructed as separate cottages. It is not known when the two structures were combined.

See also
List of listed buildings in Dunblane

References

External links

 

17th-century establishments in Scotland
Museums in Stirling (council area)
Museums established in 1943
Local museums in Scotland
Category A listed buildings in Perth and Kinross
Listed buildings in Dunblane